Mystery of the Mummy is a 1988 video game from Rainbow Arts. The game was released for Commodore 64 in August 1989.

Reception

British game magazine The Games Machine gave the game a score of 58 out of 100 stating"Mystery of the Mummy mixes interesting presentation ideas and fairly good interaction with, sadly, design faults that give the adventure an empty, unfulfilling atmosphere"

References

1988 video games
Adventure games
DOS games
Commodore 64 games
Detective video games
Rainbow Arts games
Single-player video games
Video games developed in Germany
Video games set in 1912
Video games set in Germany
Works set in the German Empire